Poh Lip Meng (10 February 1969 – 22 December 2021) was a Singaporean sport shooter who won a gold medal at the 2010 Commonwealth Games in the 25 m standard pistol pairs event and at the 2015 Southeast Asian Games in the 50 m free pistol team event.

Career 
Poh Lip Meng was a warrant officer in the Singapore Armed Forces when he joined the Singapore Shooting Association in 2002, after watching the 2002 Commonwealth Games shooting competition on television. In 2005, he gained his first individual medal at the 2005 Southeast Asian Games, a bronze medal in the 50 m free pistol event.

In 2010, Poh and Gai Bin were awarded gold for the 25 m standard pistol pairs event at the 2010 Commonwealth Games.

At the 2013 Southeast Asian Games, Poh competed in the 50 m free pistol team event, 50 m free pistol event, 10 m air pistol team event, and 10m air pistol event, and was awarded silver medals for the two team events.

In 2014, Poh, together with fellow national shooters, Gai and Nigel Lim, was awarded the bronze medal in the 25 metre standard pistol team event at the 2014 Asian Games, earning Singapore's first shooting medal in a men's team shooting event in the Asian Games.

At the 2015 Southeast Asian Games, Gai, Lim and Poh were awarded bronze medals for the 10 m air pistol team event.

At the time of his death in 2021, he had been selected to represent Singapore at the 2021 Southeast Asian Games in the 25 m rapid fire pistol event. The 2021 SEA Games were delayed to 2022 due to the COVID-19 pandemic. As of the time of his death, he held the national records for 10 m air pistol (2009) and 50 m free pistol (2011) men events.

Personal life 
Poh had two children, a son, Poh Yu Hao (born c. 2001), and a daughter. Both Lip Meng and Yu Hao had competed together at the 2018 Commonwealth Games.

He died on 22 December 2021, at the age of 52 after collapsing during a jog.

References

External links 

 

1969 births
2021 deaths
Singaporean male sport shooters
Singaporean military personnel
Shooters at the 2010 Commonwealth Games
Shooters at the 2018 Commonwealth Games
Commonwealth Games gold medallists for Singapore
Commonwealth Games medallists in shooting
Shooters at the 2010 Asian Games
Shooters at the 2014 Asian Games
Asian Games bronze medalists for Singapore
Asian Games medalists in shooting
Medalists at the 2014 Asian Games
Competitors at the 2005 Southeast Asian Games
Competitors at the 2013 Southeast Asian Games
Competitors at the 2015 Southeast Asian Games
Southeast Asian Games silver medalists for Singapore
Southeast Asian Games bronze medalists for Singapore
Southeast Asian Games medalists in shooting
20th-century Singaporean people
21st-century Singaporean people
Medallists at the 2010 Commonwealth Games